Malir River is a seasonal river located in Karachi, Sindh, Pakistan. It passes through the city of Karachi from the northeast, through the center, and drains into the Arabian Sea. It is one of the two rivers passing through Karachi, the other being the Lyari River. It has two main tributaries, the Thadho and the Sukhan.

In the rainy season, this river experiences heavy water flow, with millions of gallons emptying into the Arabian Sea. The Malir Dam is a barrage regulating flow and flooding of the river, preserving a reservoir during seasonal droughts.

The 39km Malir Expressway is underconstruction along the banks of the Malir River, connecting newer areas of development (Bahria Town) on the outskirts of the city to posh areas (DHA) in Karachi. It is controversial because it would cause displacement of poor people, destroy farms and forests, make many species of fish and birds endangered, and exacerbate the urban heat island effect and global warming.

View

See also 
 Lyari River
 Gujjar Nala
 Malir Town
 Malir District
 Karachi

External links 
Malir river video

References 

Rivers of Karachi